The Romanian New Wave is a genre of realist and often minimalist films made in Romania since the mid-aughts, starting with two award-winning shorts by two Romanian directors, namely Cristi Puiu's Cigarettes and Coffee, which won the Short Film Golden Bear at the 2004 Berlin International Film Festival, and Cătălin Mitulescu's Trafic, which won the Short Film Palme d'Or at the Cannes Film Festival later that same year.

Themes

Aesthetically, Romanian New Wave films share an austere, realist and often minimalist approach. Furthermore, black humour tends to feature prominently. While several of them are set in the late 1980s, near the end of Nicolae Ceaușescu's totalitarian rule over communist Romania, exploring themes of freedom and resilience (4 Months, 3 Weeks and 2 Days, The Paper Will Be Blue, The Way I Spent the End of the World, Tales from the Golden Age), others, however (The Death of Mr. Lăzărescu, California Dreamin', Tuesday, After Christmas), unfold in modern-day Romania, and delve into the ways the transition to democracy and free-market capitalism has shaped Romanian society after the fall of communism in late 1989.

Award-winning films and directors

Romanian New Wave films and directors have won a significant number of important international movie awards at prestigious FIAPF-accredited film festivals. Below are a few notable examples:

Legend:

Other notable installments

References

Further reading 

Realism and ideology in post-2000 Romanian cinema, by Andrei Gorzo for the British Film Institute, June 6, 2016.
 Romania continues an unlikely cinematic domination at Cannes, with a pair of rival directors, by Steven Zeitchik for Los Angeles Times, May 25, 2016.
15 Essential Films for an Introduction to the Romanian New Wave, by Andrew Ricci for Taste of Cinema, October 11, 2014.
Romania's overlooked New Wave, by Larry Rohter for The New York Times, December 18, 2013.
 The Romanian New Wave, in Bonjour Tristesse, November 1, 2010.
Cannes 2010: Those Romanians are at it again, by Steven Zeitchik for Los Angeles Times, May 13, 2010.
Romania's New Wave is riding high, by Ronald Bergman for The Guardian, March 26, 2008.
On the New Romanian Cinema, by Marina Kaceanov for A Danish Journal of Film Studies No. 25, March 25, 2008.
On The Romanian New Wave, by Ion Martea for Culture Wars, March 18, 2008.
New Wave on the Black Sea, by A.O. Scott for The New York Times, January 20, 2008.
Eastern Promise, in British Film Institute's Sight & Sound October 2007 issue.
Romanian New Wave, International Spotlight "Romania at LAFF 2007", by Vera Mijojlic for Cinema Without Borders, June 18, 2007.

Works about the Romanian Revolution
New Wave
Movements in cinema
New Wave in cinema
2000s in Romanian cinema